The 2022–23 season is F.C. Crotone's first season back in the third division of the Italian football league, the Serie C, and the 113th season in existence.

Players

First-team squad

Out on loan

Pre-season and friendlies

Competitions

Overview

Serie C

League table

Results summary

Results by round

Matches

Coppa Italia Serie C

References

F.C. Crotone seasons
Crotone